Schouweiler railway station is a railway station serving Schouweiler, in the commune of Dippach, in south-western Luxembourg.  It is operated by Chemins de Fer Luxembourgeois, the state-owned railway company.

The station is situated on Line 70, which connects the south-west of the country to Luxembourg City.

External links
 Official CFL page on Schouweiler station
 Rail.lu page on Schouweiler station

Dippach
Railway stations in Luxembourg
Railway stations on CFL Line 70